Salvirola is a comune (municipality) in the Province of Cremona in the Italian region Lombardy, located about  east of Milan and about  northwest of Cremona.

Salvirola borders the following municipalities: Cumignano sul Naviglio, Fiesco, Izano, Romanengo, Ticengo, Trigolo.

References

Cities and towns in Lombardy